Mak is a small hamlet in Ardino Municipality, Kardzhali Province, southern-central Bulgaria. It covers an area of 5.642 square kilometres and as of 2007 had a population of 1 person. The hamlet is dependent on Gurbishte for village functions, where there is also a village hall.

References

Villages in Kardzhali Province